Pat Tomberlin (born January 29, 1966) is a former American football guard and tackle. He played for the Indianapolis Colts in 1990 and for the Tampa Bay Buccaneers in 1993.

References

1966 births
Living people
Players of American football from Jacksonville, Florida
American football offensive guards
American football offensive tackles
Florida State Seminoles football players
Indianapolis Colts players
Tampa Bay Buccaneers players